David James Morland IV (born April 3, 1969) is a Canadian professional golfer who has played on the Canadian Tour, PGA Tour, and Nationwide Tour.

Morland was born in North Bay, Ontario. He turned professional in 1991 after going to Kent State University. His first professional success came in the 1999 McDonald's Prince Edward Island Challenge on the Canadian Tour.

In late 1999 Morland finished tied for 16th place in the PGA Tour Q-school to gain a place on the tour for 2000. He had four seasons playing on the PGA Tour, 2000, 2001, 2002 and 2004, and competed in a total of 120 PGA Tour events. His best season was 2002 when he finished 150th in the money list. He had three top-10 finishes, his best being to be tied for 5th place in the 2001 Canadian Open.

Morland also played a number of seasons on the Nationwide Tour winning twice, the 2002 Hibernia Southern Open and the 2003 SAS Carolina Classic. He also lost a playoff for the New Zealand PGA Championship in 2007. 2003 was his best season, finishing 18th in the money list to regain his place on the PGA Tour.

Morland finished in third place in the 2020 European Senior Tour Q-school, gaining a place on the tour for 2020. In the 2020 Hoag Classic, a PGA Tour Champions event played in March, Morland led after a first round 61. He had further rounds of 70 and 71 to finish tied for 7th place.

Professional wins (3)

Nationwide Tour wins (2)

*Note: The 2002 Hibernia Southern Open was shortened to 54 holes due to rain.

Nationwide Tour playoff record (0–1)

Canadian Tour wins (1)

Playoff record
PGA Tour of Australasia playoff record (0–1)

Results in major championships

CUT = missed the halfway cut
Note: Morland only played in the U.S. Open.

Results in senior major championships

CUT = missed the halfway cut
"T" indicates a tie for a place
NT = No tournament due to COVID-19 pandemic

See also
1999 PGA Tour Qualifying School graduates
2000 PGA Tour Qualifying School graduates
2003 Nationwide Tour graduates

References

External links

Canadian male golfers
Kent State Golden Flashes men's golfers
PGA Tour golfers
Korn Ferry Tour graduates
Golfing people from Ontario
Sportspeople from North Bay, Ontario
1969 births
Living people